John Ruhl is a professor of physics at Case Western Reserve University. He received a BS in physics from the University of Michigan in 1987 and a Ph.D. in physics from Princeton in 1993. While a graduate student at Princeton, Ruhl, along with several other graduate students, co-authored the text Princeton Problems in Physics.

Ruhl is an experimentalist in cosmology. He studies the cosmic microwave background radiation and is currently co-principal investigator on the Spider and South Pole Telescope projects.

Ruhl was also principal investigator on the ACBAR and Boomerang experiments.

Outside of experimental physics, Ruhl is also the leader of the Institute for Sustainability at Case. Ruhl was on the steering committee for the Climate Action Plan at Case Western.

References

External links
 Faculty page
 John Ruhl's personal webpage
 Institute for Sustainability

Case Western Reserve University faculty
Living people
University of Michigan College of Literature, Science, and the Arts alumni
Princeton University alumni
21st-century American physicists
Year of birth missing (living people)
Fellows of the American Physical Society